Kurt Chill (1 May 1895 – 5 July 1976) was a German general during World War II who commanded the LV. Armeekorps. He was a recipient of the Knight's Cross of the Iron Cross of Nazi Germany.

Awards and decorations

 Knight's Cross of the Iron Cross on 25 October 1943 as Generalleutnant and commander of 122. Infanterie-Division

References

Citations

Bibliography

1895 births
1976 deaths
German Army personnel of World War I
German police officers
German prisoners of war in World War II held by the United Kingdom
Lieutenant generals of the German Army (Wehrmacht)
Luftstreitkräfte personnel
People from Toruń
People from West Prussia
Recipients of the clasp to the Iron Cross, 2nd class
Recipients of the Gold German Cross
Recipients of the Knight's Cross of the Iron Cross